Bus Stop is a 1956 American romantic comedy-drama film directed by Joshua Logan for 20th Century Fox, starring Marilyn Monroe, Don Murray, Arthur O'Connell, Betty Field, Eileen Heckart, Robert Bray, and Hope Lange.

Unlike most of Monroe's films, Bus Stop is neither a full-fledged comedy nor a musical, but rather a dramatic piece; it was the first film she appeared in after studying at the Actors Studio in New York. Monroe does, however, sing one song: "That Old Black Magic" by Harold Arlen and Johnny Mercer.

Bus Stop was based on the 1955 play of the same title (which in turn was expanded from an earlier, one act play People in the Wind) by William Inge. The inspiration for the play came from people Inge met in Tonganoxie, Kansas.

Plot
A naive, unintelligent, socially inept, loud-mouth cowboy, Beauregard Decker, and his friend and father-figure Virgil Blessing take the bus from Timber Hill, Montana to Phoenix, Arizona, to participate in a rodeo. Virgil has encouraged the 21-year-old virgin, Beau, to take an interest in "gals". Initially reluctant and frightened of the idea, Beau declares that he hopes to find an "angel" and will know her when he sees her. Making trouble everywhere they go, he continues his unsophisticated behavior in Grace's Diner. In Phoenix, at the Blue Dragon Café, he imagines himself in love with the café's chanteuse, Chérie, an ambitious performer from the Ozarks with aspirations of becoming a Hollywood star. Her rendition of "That Old Black Magic" entrances him and he forces her outside, despite the establishment's rules against it, kisses her and thinks that means they are engaged. Chérie is physically attracted to him but resists his plans to take her back to Montana. She has no intention of marrying him and tells him so, but he is too stubborn to listen.

The next day, Beau gets a marriage license, and then takes an exhausted Chérie to the rodeo parade and the rodeo, where he rides the bucking bronco and then competes in the calf-roping and the bull-riding. Beau intends to marry Chérie at the rodeo, but she runs away. He tracks her down at the Blue Dragon Café, where she jumps out a rear window and flees. Beau catches her, and forces her on the bus back to Montana. On the way, they stop at Grace's Diner, the same place the bus stopped on the way to Phoenix. Chérie tries to make another getaway while Beau is asleep on the bus, but the road ahead is blocked by snow and the bus won't be leaving at all so they are all stranded there. The bus driver, Carl, the waitress, Elma, and the café owner, Grace, by now all have learned that Beau is kidnapping and bullying the girl. Virgil and the bus driver fight him until he promises to apologize to Chérie and leave her alone. He, however, is unable to do so because he is humiliated about having been beaten.

The next morning, the storm has cleared and everybody is free to go. Beau finally apologizes to Chérie for his abusive behavior and begs her forgiveness. He wishes her well and prepares to depart without her. Chérie approaches him and confesses that she's had many boyfriends and is not the kind of woman he thinks she is. Beau confesses his lack of experience to her. Beau asks to kiss her goodbye and they share their first real kiss. All Chérie wanted from a man was respect, which she had previously told the waitress when they sat together on the bus. This new Beau attracts Chérie. He accepts her past and this gesture touches her heart. She tells him that she will go anywhere with him. Virgil decides to stay behind. When Beau tries to coerce him to go with them, Chérie reminds him that he can't force Virgil to do what he wants. Having finally apparently learned his lesson, Beau offers Chérie his jacket and gallantly helps her onto the bus.

Cast

 Marilyn Monroe as Chérie
 Don Murray as Beauregard Decker
 Arthur O'Connell as Virgil Blessing
 Betty Field as Grace
 Eileen Heckart as Vera
 Robert Bray as Carl the bus driver
 Hope Lange as Elma Duckworth
 Hans Conried as Life Magazine Photographer
 Casey Adams as Life Magazine Reporter

Production
Bus Stop was the first film that Monroe chose to make under a new contract. For the role, she learned an Ozark accent, chose costumes and make-up that lacked the glamour of her earlier films, and provided deliberately mediocre singing and dancing. Joshua Logan, known for his work on Broadway, agreed to direct, despite initially doubting Monroe's acting abilities and knowing of her reputation for being difficult. The filming took place in Idaho and Arizona in early 1956, with Monroe "technically in charge" as the head of MMP (Marilyn Monroe Productions, her film production company), occasionally making decisions on cinematography and with Logan adapting to her chronic tardiness and perfectionism.

The experience changed Logan's opinion of Monroe, and he later compared her to Charlie Chaplin in her ability to blend comedy and tragedy.

George Axelrod, who wrote the script, later said:
I liked that very much. And I think even William Inge now concedes it is at least as good as the play. Because, given the necessities of the stage, he had to cram it all into that one set, whereas it was a play very susceptible to being opened up. It took Marilyn two years to realise that this was her best performance. Indeed, she did not speak to either Josh Logan or me for a year afterwards, because she felt we’d cut the picture in favour of the boy. Later she came to realise she  was wrong. It suggests to me that actors have a very dim appreciation of what’s good or what's bad about their performances.

Critical reception
Bus Stop became a box office success, earning more than $7 million in rentals (revenue paid to the distributor), and received mainly favorable reviews, with Monroe's performance being highly praised. The Saturday Review of Literature wrote that Monroe's performance "effectively dispels once and for all the notion that she is merely a glamour personality". Bosley Crowther of The New York Times praised the lead performances, as well as O'Connell, Eckart, Field and Bray.

Review aggregation website Rotten Tomatoes gives the film an approval rating of 79% based on 14 reviews and an average score of 7.3/10.

Accolades

See also
 List of American films of 1956

References

Sources

External links

 
 
 
 
 Description of the Seeburg Model 146 Jukebox in the Bus Stop

1956 films
1956 comedy-drama films
1956 romantic comedy films
1956 romantic drama films
1950s road comedy-drama films
1950s romantic comedy-drama films
20th Century Fox films
CinemaScope films
American films based on plays
American road comedy-drama films
American romantic comedy-drama films
1950s English-language films
Films about buses
Films based on multiple works
Films directed by Joshua Logan
Films scored by Alfred Newman
Films scored by Cyril J. Mockridge
Films set in Montana
Films set in Phoenix, Arizona
Films set in Utah
Films shot in Arizona
Films shot in Sun Valley, Idaho
Films with screenplays by George Axelrod
1950s American films